The Latinate surname Crellius may refer to three generations of Socinian theologians:

 Johannes Crellius, Jan Crell 1590–1633, father
 Christopher Crellius, Krzysztof Crell-Spinowski (Latin: Spinovius) 1622–1680, son
 Samuel Crellius, Samuel Crell-Spinowski 1660–1747, grandson